Aleksandr Yuryevich Vasyutin (born 4 March 1995) is a Russian football player who plays as a goalkeeper for Russian club Zenit Saint Petersburg.

Club career
In his first game for FC Lahti on 13 August 2016 against PK-35 Vantaa, he scored a last-minute equalizer for his team. He won FC Lahti's player of the year, FC Lahti fans' player of the year and Finnish league goalkeeper of the year awards in 2017.

He rejoined FC Lahti on a new loan in April 2018.

On 5 July 2018 he joined Norwegian club Sarpsborg 08, signing a 2.5-year contract.

On 23 July 2019, he returned to Zenit, signing a four-year contract. He made his first competitive appearance for Zenit's senior squad on 30 October 2019 in a Russian Cup game against FC Tom Tomsk. He made his Russian Premier League debut for Zenit on 15 July 2020, when he started the game against FC Orenburg.

On 11 February 2021, he joined Swedish club Djurgårdens IF on loan. The club had an option to make the transfer permanent after the loan period. On 10 January 2022, the loan was extended until the end of 2022.

Career statistics

Honours
Zenit Saint Petersburg
Russian Premier League: 2019–20
Russian Cup: 2019–20

Individual
Veikkausliiga Goalkeeper of the Year: 2017
Veikkausliiga Team of the Year: 2017

References

External links
 
 

1995 births
Footballers from Saint Petersburg
Living people
Russian footballers
Association football goalkeepers
Russian expatriate footballers
FC Lahti players
Sarpsborg 08 FF players
FC Zenit Saint Petersburg players
Djurgårdens IF Fotboll players
Veikkausliiga players
Eliteserien players
Russian Premier League players
Allsvenskan players
Expatriate footballers in Finland
Expatriate footballers in Norway
Expatriate footballers in Sweden
Russian expatriate sportspeople in Finland
Russian expatriate sportspeople in Norway
Russian expatriate sportspeople in Sweden